Rani Ki Vav is a stepwell situated in the town of Patan in Gujarat, India. It is located on the banks of the Saraswati River. Its construction is attributed to Udayamati, the spouse of the 11th-century Chaulukya king Bhima I. Silted over, it was rediscovered in the 1940s and restored in the 1980s by the Archaeological Survey of India. It has been listed as one of the UNESCO World Heritage Sites in India since 2014.

The finest and one of the largest examples of its kind, this stepwell is designed as an inverted temple highlighting the sanctity of water. It is divided into seven levels of stairs with sculptural panels. These panels have more than 500 principal sculptures and over a thousand minor ones that combine religious and symbolic  imagery.

History 

Rani ki vav was constructed during the rule of the Chaulukya dynasty. It is located on the banks of Saraswati river. Prabandha-Chintamani, composed by the Jain monk Merutunga in 1304, mentions: "Udayamati, the daughter of Naravaraha Khengara, built this novel stepwell at Shripattana (Patan) surpassing the glory of the Sahasralinga Tank". According to it, the stepwell was commissioned in 1063 and was completed after 20 years. It is generally assumed that it was built in the memory of Bhima I by his queen Udayamati and probably completed by Udayamati and Karna after his death but whether she was a widow when she commissioned it is disputed. Commissariat puts the date of construction to 1032 based on the architectural similarity to Vimalavasahi temple on Mount Abu built in the same year.

The stepwell was later flooded by the Saraswati river and silted over. In 1890s, Henry Cousens and James Burgess visited it when it was completely buried under the earth and only well shaft and few pillars were visible. In  Travels in Western India, James Tod mentioned that the material from the stepwell was reused in the other stepwell built in modern Patan, probably Trikam Barot ni Vav (Bahadur Singh stepwell). In the 1940s, excavations carried out under the Baroda State revealed the stepwell. In 1986, a major excavation and restoration was carried out by the Archaeological Survey of India (ASI). An image of Udayamati was also recovered during the excavation. The restoration was carried out from 1981 to 1987.

Rani ki vav has been declared a Monument of National Importance and protected by the ASI. It was added to the list of UNESCO's World Heritage Sites on 22 June 2014. It was named India's "Cleanest Iconic Place" at the 2016 Indian Sanitation Conference.

Architecture 

Rani ki vav is considered as the finest and one of the largest example of stepwell architecture in Gujarat. It was built at the height of craftsmens’ ability in stepwell construction and the Maru-Gurjara architecture style, reflecting mastery of this complex technique and beauty of detail and proportions. The architecture and sculptures are similar to the Vimalavasahi temple on Mount Abu and Sun temple at Modhera.

It is classified as a Nanda-type stepwell. The stepwell is divided into seven levels of stairs which lead down to deep circular well. A stepped corridor is compartmentalized at regular intervals with pillared multistory pavilions. The walls, pillars, columns, brackets and beams are ornamented with carvings and scroll work. The niches in the side walls are ornamented with beautiful and delicate figures and sculptures. There are 212 pillars in the stepwell.

Sculptures 

There are more than 500 principal sculptures and over a thousand minor ones often referencing literary works in combination with religious, symbolic and secular imagery. The ornamentation of stepwell depicts the entire universe inhabited by gods and goddesses; celestial beings; men and women; monks, priests and laity; animals, fishes and birds including seen and unseen ones; as well as plants and trees.

The stepwell is designed as an underground shrine or inverted temple. It has spiritual significance and represents the sanctity of water. Sculptures in the stepwell depict numerous Hindu deities including Brahma, Vishnu, Shiva, Ganesha, Kubera, Lakulisha, Bhairava, Surya, Indra and Hayagrivaand goddesses (Devi). The sculptures associated with Vishnu outnumber all other deities mentioned above and include Sheshashayi Vishnu (Vishnu reclining on the thousand-hooded snake Shesha in the celestial ocean), Vishwarupa Vishnu (Cosmic form of Vishnu), twenty-four forms as well as Dashavatara (ten incarnations) of Vishnu.

The sculptures of deities with their families such as Brahma-Savitri, Uma-Maheshwar and Lakshmi-Narayan are there. Notable among other sculptures are Ardhanarishwara as well as large number of goddesses such as Lakshmi, Parvati,  Saraswati, Chamunda, Durga/Mahishasurmardini with twenty hands, Kshemankari, Suryani and Saptamatrikas. There are images of Navagraha (nine planets) as well.

There are a large number of celestial beings (Apsaras). One sculpture of an Apsara depicts either applying lipstick to her lips or chewing on aromatic twig while a man is attending her feet. On the northern side of the third storey pavilion, there is a sculpture of an Apsara warding off a monkey clinging to her leg and pulling her. At her feet, there is a nude female with a snake around her neck. A sculpture of Nagkanya (a serpent princess) with long hair and a swan, as well as sculptures of celestial dancers in classical dance positions are there.

There are large number of sculptures portraying women in their everyday life and activities. One sculpture depicts a woman combing her hair, adjusting her earring  and looking at herself in the mirror. Other sculptures include a woman writing a letter, a young woman with a scorpion climbing her right leg and her clothes sliding off unknowingly, a young woman pulling a beard of a dwarf-like man, a woman with fish plate in her hands with a snake encircling her leg and reaching out to fish. One sculpture depicts a young woman coming out of her bath with wet hair and a swan catching droplets of water falling from her hair like pearls. The women in these sculptures are adorned with jewelry including bangles, earrings, necklaces, waist girdles, anklets and others as well as with elegant clothes and well combed hair. The variety of expressions and emotions are depicted in them. They represent beauty as well as love in its sublime and seductive forms. There are sculptures representing maternal love such as a woman holding her child and pointing to the moon to divert his attention, a woman raising her child high to let him pick a mango from tree, and a woman in a mango grove accompanied by children.

There are gradually increasing cantilevered brackets in the well shaft which are profusely ornamented. Kalpavriksha carvings on the wall represent fertility and nature worship while kirtimukhas and makaras adorn the basements and capitals of pillars. There are latticework patterns and designs resembling geometric local textile designs, and traditionalPatola are featured on the wall at the stepwell's northern entrance. These may have been adapted from wood carvings and ceilings seen in temples. Figures of horses, elephants and lions decorate pillars and basement moldings.

Depiction 
Since July 2018, the 100 banknote of Mahatma Gandhi New Series, features Rani Ki Vav on the reverse.

References

Further reading

External links 
 3D Model

Stepwells in Gujarat
Buildings and structures in Gujarat
Tourist attractions in Patan district
World Heritage Sites in India
Cultural history of Gujarat
Rajput architecture
Monuments of National Importance in Gujarat
Māru-Gurjara architecture
Water Heritage Sites in India